So Happy Together may refer to:

 So Happy Together (album), by Grifters, 1992
 So Happy Together (film), a 2004 Filipino film
 "So Happy Together", an episode of the Mighty B!
 A line from Happy Together (song), 1967 song by The Turtles

See also
 So Happy (disambiguation)
 Happy Together (disambiguation)